Julio Peralta and Horacio Zeballos were the defending champions, but Peralta chose not to participate this year. Zeballos played alongside Leonardo Mayer, but lost in the first round to Pablo Cuevas and Nicolás Jarry.

Oliver Marach and Jürgen Melzer won the title, defeating Robin Haase and Wesley Koolhof in the final, 6–2, 7–6(7–3).

Seeds

Draw

Draw

Qualifying

Seeds

Qualifiers
  Julian Lenz /  Daniel Masur

Qualifying draw

References

External links
 Main Draw
 Qualifying Draw

Hamburg European Open - Doubles
2019 Hamburg European Open